Mamun Joarder (born 1 April 1973), is a retired Bangladeshi footballer who played as a right winger. Mamun played for a total of 7 clubs during his 15 year long career, and he won the Dhaka League title with both Abahani Limited Dhaka and Muktijoddha Sangsad KC.

Mamun was also a member of the Bangladesh national football team that won its first international trophy, the Burma Cup in 1995, under coach Otto Pfister. He went on to represent his country from 1990 to 1997, scoring a total of 6 recorded goals.

Personal life
Mamun's father Alfaz Uddin Joardar was a British footballer. His brother Abdul Qadir Joardar played in Aga Khan Gold Cup in 1976. Growing up Mamun was a Mohammedan SC supporter. Both his father and brothers had encouraged Mamun to go to Dhaka, in order to become a professional footballer.

After retiring from football in 2000 with Muktijoddha Sangsad KC, Mamun moved to Canada with his wife and 3 children.

Dhaka league career

Early career
Mamun Joarder started his youth career in Chuadanga, after passing various stages of selection of U-16 footballers he came to Dhaka to take part in the divisional league final match for Khulna Division. After impressing the national team scouts present during the final, Mamun got called up for the Bangladesh U-16 national team training camp. However, he was not picked for the final squad. Mamun later went on to play for the U-19 national team. During 1985, Azad Sporting coach Anjam, gave Mamun the opportunity to play the last two matches of the season in. Mamun then went on to play for Chalantika FC and Wari Club over the next couple of years. In 1988 Mamun joined mid-table side Victoria SC after doing well in his second season at the club, he earned a move to domestic giants Mohammedan SC, in 1990.

Dhaka Mohammedan
Abdus Salam Murshedy, who was the director of Mohammedan at the time, signed Mamun, after being impressed with his performance with Victoria SC during his second season at the club. Mamun, played for Mohammedan in the Ma-Moni Gold Cup, BTC Cup, Independence Cup, 1990–91 Asian Cup Winners' Cup, in Saudi Arabia. He was a vital player for Mohammedan during the 1990–91 Asian Club Championship which took place in Dhaka. Mamun scored goals against Club Lagoons from Maldives and Salgaocar SC of India, in the group stages, helping Mohammedan reach the quarter-final round, becoming the first Bangladeshi club to do so. For that, he was awarded the best player of tournament, with the verdict of Sports Writers Association.

However, Mamun did not get a chance to play the Dhaka League with Mohammedan, Iranian coach Nasser Hejazi who was the manager of Mohammedan at the time, preferred to play the country's poster boy at the time, Sabbir, at the left wing position instead of Mamun, and after developing an uncertainty over his game time at the club, Mamun decided to leave Mohammedan. Although the clubs director Salam Murshedy offered Mamun a salary of 12 lakh taka per season, Mamun decided to join arch-rivals Abahani Dhaka for a lower salary of 11 lakh, in 1992. Mamun was heavily criticized by both the media and Mohammedan fans due to his sudden transfer to fellow title contenders.

Abahani Limited
Abahani manager Kazi Salahuddin signed Mamun in order to replace legendary winger Kazi Anwar, and upon sigining he was guaranteed a starting spot in the team. During the 1992 league season, when the two clubs met in the Dhaka Derby, Abahani only needed a draw to claim the league title. However, Mohammedan took the lead early on into the game, Abahani manager Salahuddin had named Mamun on the bench due to allegations of match fixing. Mamun came on to the field with 35 minutes left in the second half and within a few minutes after coming on, he scored the equalizer after a deflected header from teammate Sheikh Aslam fell to his feet. Mamun scored again after 5 minutes, this time he dribbled past 2 Mohammedan defenders to slot the ball into the net by beating goalkeeper Kanan. The game ended 2–1, and Mamun won his first league trophy with Abahani. 

In 1994, Mamun also scored against Kolkata Mohammedan, as Abahani won India's Charms Cup trophy, defeating the Kolkata side 2–0 in the final. During his time at the club Mamun developed a great partnership with Russian midfielder Sergey Zhukov. Along with Zhukov, Abahani had local star players such as Munna, Rehan, Alamgir Hassan and Rumi, who helped them dominate the league that year. However, at the end of 1994 all 4 of them (except Monem Munna) including Mamun left Abahani to join Muktijoddha SKC, after the country's top three clubs Mohammedan, Abahani and Brothers Union made a gentleman's agreement to lower the salaries of lower the salaries of their star players.

Muktijoddha SKC
Manjur Kader who was in charge of Muktijoddha SKC signed 11 national team players alongside Mamun, in order to beat the country's top three teams to the league title. However, even after the heavy spending Mamun was not able to help his team win the league as, his former club Abahani clinched the title. Although the club failed to win the league, Mamun created a lethal partnership with Imtiaz Ahmed Nakib, both at club and national team, his assists helped Nakib become Mukitojoddha's all-time top scorer. Mamun's only trophy for the "freedom fighters" during his first stint at the club was the 1994 Federation Cup, which he won by defeating Abahani 3–2 in the final. And after 4 years at the club, he returned to Abahani Limited, in 1997.

Final years & Retirement
In 1997, Mamun made his return to Abahani Limited, however, he was not able to win the league title on his return as, Muktijoddha tasted their first Dhaka league, only a few months after Mamun’s departure from the club. Mamun also sustained a massive injury during a Dhaka derby match, after his return to Abahani. During the game Mohammedan captain Kaiser Hamid and Mamun both went in for a header, and at the same time goalkeeper Kanan went in to clear the ball only to fall over Mamun and break his arm. The injury Mamun sustained along with a knee meniscus surgery turned out to be detrimental to his career and lead to him soon losing his place in the Bangladesh national team. Although Kanan had said that the fall on Mamun was accidental, Mamun later stated during an interview that he felt it was done intentionally out of revenge for the 1992 double he scored past Kanan to win Abahani the league, and in terms ending Kanan's international career.

Mamun left Abahani once again after winning a couple of Federation Cup trophies, and returned to Muktijoddha SKC. During his final season as a professional footballer, Mamun was at last able to win the Dhaka League title with Muktijoddha. He played his last professional match against former club Mohammedan in August 2000, at the Bangabandhu National Stadium.

Interest from Malaysia
During his time at Abahani, Mamun attracted interest from an unknown club from the Malaysian Professional League. However, Abahani officials did not allow him to move, and due to the influence of Abahani, the Bangladesh Football Federation was not able to give him the clearance to complete the transfer.

International career
After playing for the Bangladesh U19, Mamun was called up to the Bangladesh U23 team which would compete in the 1992 Summer Olympics qualifiers in May 1991. During the qualifying games Mamun had developed a formidable partnership with striker Imtiaz Ahmed Nakib, his assists helped Nakib score a total of 8 goals in the 8 matches that where played, he also managed to assist Nakib's winner against Malaysia U23. Mamun also found the net twice when Bangladesh thrashed Philippines U23 8–0. However, with 3 wins from 9 matches, Bangladesh finished fifth in the group and failed to qualify for the main tournament.

Mamun made his senior national team debut for Bangladesh during the 1990 Asian Games against Saudi Arabia, on 24 September 1990. He was later selected for the 1991 South Asian Games, after impressing for the Olympic side at the 1992 Summer Olympics qualifiers, earlier during the year. On 28 December 1991, Mamun scored his first senior goal for his country as, Bangladesh won their first bronze medal in the South Asian Games, defeating Nepal 2–0. Mamun was also vital for his country during the 1994 FIFA World Cup qualifiers, scoring 3 goals over 5 games which he played. The teams coach at the time Kazi Salahuddin put Mamun on the bench during the qualifying game against Thailand due politics in the country's federation, however, Mamun managed to score one after coming on in the second half as, Bangladesh lost the match 4–1. During the last game of the qualifiers against Sri Lanka, Mamun scored a brace as Bangladesh dismantled their opponents 3–0.

The 1995 Burma Cup held in October of that year in Myanmar saw one of Mamun's best performances for the national team. Although Bangladesh started the tournament with a 4–0 defeat to hosts Myanmar, they managed to win the following two games to reach the final where they faced Myanmar once again, and during the final Mamun scored to equalize for Bangladesh and then went on to set up the winner for Nakib as, Bangladesh won their first ever international trophy, and Mamun won the player of the tournament award.

Mamun's last recorded goal for Bangladesh came against Nepal in the 1995 South Asian Games held in India. He scored a long-range strike to win Bangladesh the game 2–1, however, he was unable to help the country win gold as they lost the final of the tournament to hosts India 1–0. Mamun played his last international tournament during the country's disappointing 1997 SAFF Championship in Nepal.

International goals

Bangladesh U23
Scores and results list Bangladesh's goal tally first.

Bangladesh
Scores and results list Bangladesh's goal tally first.

International goals for club

Dhaka Mohammedan
Scores and results list Dhaka Mohammedan goal tally first.

Abahani Limited Dhaka
Scores and results list Abahani Limited Dhaka goal tally first.

Honours

Club 
Abahani Limited 
Dhaka League = 1994
Federation Cup = 1997,1999
Charms Cup (India) = 1991

Muktijoddha SKC
Dhaka League = 2000
Federation Cup = 1994

International 
Bangladesh
South Asian Games Silver medal: 1995; Bronze medal: 1991
Four-nation Invitational Football Tournament = 1995

References

External links 
 

Living people
1973 births
People from Khulna District
Bangladeshi footballers
Bangladesh international footballers
Bangladesh youth international footballers
Mohammedan SC (Dhaka) players
Abahani Limited (Dhaka) players
Muktijoddha Sangsad KC players
Association football forwards
Asian Games competitors for Bangladesh
Footballers at the 1990 Asian Games
South Asian Games medalists in football
South Asian Games silver medalists for Bangladesh
South Asian Games bronze medalists for Bangladesh